Optimove is a privately held company that develops and markets a Relationship Marketing software as a service (SaaS). Optimove's product has a Customer Data Platform at its core and applies algorithmic optimization to autonomously improve multichannel campaigns. 
The company serves various industries, including retail, eCommerce, travel and hospitality, gaming, and financial services.

Corporate History
Optimove (initially named Mobius Solutions) was founded in 2009 by Pini Yakuel and Shachar Cohen, and released the first version of its software (initially named Customer Value Maximizer) in 2010.

The company is headquartered in Tel Aviv, Israel, with additional offices in London (opened in 2015) and New York City (opened in 2016) and employs more than 200 people.

Optimove partners include IBM, Internet gaming platform provider iSoftBet, India's largest poker site, Adda52.com, binary options trading platform provider, TradoLogic, and social gaming operators Crazy Panda, Jelly Button Games and LuckyFish Games.

Funding, Branding, and Acquisitions
In September 2016, Optimove raised its first outside funding, a $20 million round from Israel Growth Partners that valued the company at $100 million.

In May 2017, the company launched PostFunnel.com, an educational content marketing project in the form of a digital professional publication, aimed at Relationship Marketing professionals that it operated for 5 years. In 2019 the company expanded the PostFunnel brand to include all customer and industry events the company organizes and hosts.

In 2018 Optimove acquired the DynamicMail business from PowerInbox.

In early 2020 it announced the acquisition of Axonite.

In September 2021 the company announced a $75 millions growth fund investment, secured from Summit Partners.

In March 2022 the company announced the acquisition of mobile marketing platform provider Kumulos.

In July 2022 the company announced the acquisition of personalization platform Graphyte.

Software and Technology
Optimove is a SaaS application that implements a systematic approach to planning, executing, measuring and optimizing a company's customer marketing plan with the goal of maximizing customer lifetime value. The software models each customer's behavior and preferences in order to predict which marketing campaigns will be most relevant for each individual.

The marketing channels supported by Optimove include email, SMS, mobile push notification, website/app pop-ups, Facebook Custom Audiences and Google Ads.

The software is based on a combination of technologies, including predictive customer modeling, customer micro-segmentation, multi-channel campaign automation, real-time campaign triggers, and systematic campaign optimization using scientific control methodologies. The application's primary interface is a calendar-based marketing management tool that helps users track and optimize campaigns. Campaigns are analyzed as measurable marketing experiments so that users can determine the financial uplift that each marketing campaign generated.

The Optimove product doesn't collect or use any customer-identifying demographic data, which eases privacy concerns.

Critical reception 
 Deloitte Consulting included Optimove in the Deloitte EMEA 2016 Technology Fast 500, 8 December 2016
 Deloitte Consulting included Optimove in the Deloitte Israel 2016 Technology Fast 50 list, 29 November 2016
 Israel21c included Optimove in its list of 11 Israeli companies to watch in marketing technology, May 4, 2016.
 Killer Startups included Optimove in its list of 14 Marketing Automation Tools That Can Save Hundreds Of Hours, January 15, 2015.
 The Huffington Post included Optimove in its list of 10 Impressive Tel Aviv Tech Startups, August 6, 2013.
 Forbes included Optimove in its list of 15 Marketing Software That Can Boost Your Business, July 28, 2013.
 Silverpop selected Optimove as its 2013 EMEA Partner of the Year, July 2, 2013.

References

External links
 Company Website

Software companies of Israel